Corky of Gasoline Alley is a 1951 American comedy film directed by Edward Bernds and starring Scotty Beckett, Jimmy Lydon, and Susan Morrow. It is a sequel to Gasoline Alley.

Plot
Elwood Martin (Gordon Jones), a brash extrovert with an aversion to work, come to live with Walt Wallet (Don Beddoe) and his wife, Phyllis (Madelon Baker). He blunders about their house, and the diner owned by Corky Wallet (Scotty Beckett) and the fix-it shop belonging to Skeezix Wallet (Jimmy Lydon), creating havoc at every stop. Corky and his kid sister, Judy Wallet (Patti Brady) decide the only way to save the Wallet family from bankruptcy and insanity is to persuade the free-loading Elwood to move on. The latter then fakes an injured back.

Cast
 Scotty Beckett as Corky Wallet 
 Jimmy Lydon as Skeezix Wallet 
 Don Beddoe as Walt Wallet 
 Gordon Jones as Elwood Martin 
 Patti Brady as Judy Wallet 
 Susan Morrow as Hope Wallet 
 Kay Christopher as Nina Clock Wallet 
 Madelon Baker as Phyllis Wallet 
 Dick Wessel as Pudge McKay 
 Ludwig Stössel as Dr. Hammerschlag
 John Dehner as Jefferson Jay (uncredited)

References

Further reading
 Bernard F. Dick. Columbia Pictures: Portrait of a Studio. University Press of Kentucky, 2015.

External links
 

1951 films
1951 comedy films
American comedy films
Films directed by Edward Bernds
Columbia Pictures films
American black-and-white films
1950s English-language films
1950s American films
English-language comedy films